Iwaidja, in phonemic spelling Iwaja, is an Australian aboriginal language of the Iwaidja people with about 150 native, and an extra 20 to 30 L2 speakers in northernmost Australia. Historically having come from the base of the Cobourg Peninsula, it is now spoken on Croker Island. It is still being learnt by children within the Northern Territory.

Phonology

Consonants
Iwaidja has the following 20 consonants.

The plosives are allophonically voiced, and are often written .

Vowels

Iwaidja has three vowels, /a, i, u/.  The following table shows the allophones of these vowels as described by Pym and Larrimore.

Morphophonemics

Iwaidja has extensive morphophonemic alternation. For example, body parts occur with possessive prefixes, and these alter the first consonant in the root:

Both the words arm and to be sick originally started with an /m/, as shown in related languages such as Maung. The pronominal prefix for it, its altered the first consonant of the root. In Iwaidja, this form extended to the masculine and feminine, so that gender distinctions were lost, and the prefix disappeared, leaving only the consonant mutation—a situation perhaps unique in Australia, but not unlike that of the Celtic languages.

Semantics
The Iwaidja languages are nearly unique among the languages of the world in using verbs for kin terms. Nouns are used for direct address, but transitive verbs in all other cases. In English something similar is done in special cases: he fathered a child; she mothers him too much. But these do not indicate social relationships in English. For example, he fathered a child says nothing about whether he is the man the child calls "father". An Iwaidja speaker, on the other hand, says I nephew her to mean "she is my aunt". Because these are verbs, they can be inflected for tense. In the case of in-laws, this is equivalent to my ex-wife or the bride-to-be in English. However, with blood relations, past can only mean that the person has died, and future only that they are yet to be born.

Alternative names
 Yibadjdja (Kunwinjku exonym).

Notes

References

 Nicholas Evans, 2000. "Iwaidjan, a very un-Australian language family." In Linguistic Typology 4, 91-142. Mouton de Gruyter.

External links

AuSIL's Iwaidja dictionary (available from Iwaidja to English and English to Iwaidja)
DOBES documentation of endangered languages, Iwaidja
OLAC resources in and about the Iwaidja language
Crowd-sourcing and Language documentation:  Ma! Iwaidja phrasebook and dictionary iPhone App

Iwaidjan languages